Public artworks that have been displayed in Denver, Colorado, include:

 1.26
 Armenian Khachkar, Colorado State Capitol
 Articulated Wall
 Balloon Man Running
 Blue Mustang, Denver International Airport
 Bridge
 Bronco Buster
 Civil War Monument, also known as Soldier's Monument
 The Closing Era, Colorado State Capitol
 Colorado Tribute to Veterans Monument, Colorado State Capitol
 Confluence Park Marker
 Dancers
 For Jennifer
 The Garrison Frieze
 Homage to the Pioneer
 I Know You Know That I Know
 I See What You Mean
 Indeterminate Line
 Iridescent Cloud
 Liberty Bell, Colorado State Capitol
 The Meeting Place
 National Velvet
 On the War Trail
 Pioneer Fountain, also known as Pioneer Monument
 The Red Forest
 Shadow Array
 Soft Landing
 Statue of Christopher Columbus
 Statue of Jack Swigert, Denver International Airport
 Statue of Joe P. Martínez, Colorado State Capitol
 Statue of Martin Luther King Jr.
 Sun Silo
 Thatcher Memorial Fountain
 Un Corrido Para la Gente
 Veterans Memorial
 Wheel
 William Jackson Palmer Plaque

See also
 Burns Park Sculpture Garden
 Statue of Martin Luther King Jr. (Pueblo, Colorado), formerly installed in Denver's City Park

References

External links

 Denver Public Art
 Public Art Walking Tour of Denver, Colorado.com
 The Best New Public Art in Denver in 2018...and Through the Decade, Westword

Public art
Denver
Outdoor sculptures in Denver
Public art in Colorado